Aristotelia balanocentra is a moth of the family Gelechiidae. It was described by Edward Meyrick in 1914. It is found in South Africa, where it has been recorded from KwaZulu-Natal.

The forewings are fuscous irregularly mixed with dark fuscous and with a blackish dot beneath the costa at one-sixth, one obliquely beneath and beyond it, a larger one beneath the costa beyond one-third, a black dash on the fold beneath this, and an elongate dot in the disc at two-thirds. The hindwings are pale grey.

References

Endemic moths of South Africa
Moths described in 1914
Aristotelia (moth)
Moths of Africa